Robert Bonnaud (13 November 1929 – 22 January 2013) was a French anti-colonialist historian and professor of history at the Paris Diderot University.

In 1957, following the advice of his friend Pierre Vidal-Naquet, he published in Esprit an article entitled La Paix des Nementchas (Nementchas’ Peace), where he denounced massacres he witnessed made by the French army in Algeria, on the 25th and 26 October 1956. In June 1961, he was arrested and jailed in Marseilles' Baumettes prison as a supporter of the Algerian nationalists of the FLN; Hargreaves calls him "the leader of the Jeanson network in the Marseilles region". In June 1962, two months after the Evian agreements and the proclamation of Algeria's independence, Bonnaud was released but suspended from all teaching duties. That restriction was lifted two years later and he was formally pardoned in 1966.

Bonnaud was born in Marseilles, France.  He dedicated his life to the study of universal history, and has been presented as a "meta-historian", a "philosopher of history", a theorist of the evolution of the noosphere.  He died, aged 83, in Paris.

References

Further reading 
An interview in Vacarme (2001) 
Pierre Vidal-Naquet, Mémoires, Paris : Seuil, 1995
General Paul Aussaresses, The Battle of the Casbah: Terrorism and Counter-Terrorism in Algeria, 1955–1957. (New York: Enigma Books, 2010) .

Bibliography 
Victoires sur le temps. Essais comparatistes. Polybe le Grec et Siman Qian le Chinois,  Condeixa : La Ligne d'ombre , 2007, 
La Cause du Sud – L'Algérie d'hier et d'aujourd'hui, la Palestine, les nations… Ecrits politiques 1956–2000, Paris : L'Harmattan, 2001, .
Histoire et historiens de 1900 à nos jours : l'histoire nouvelle. Au-delà de l'histoire, Paris : Kimé, 2001 (review in Cairn 
Tournants et périodes ; essai sur les durées historiques et les années récentes,  Kimé, Paris, 2000.
L'Histoire,  le progrès, le communisme. Théories et confidences, Paris : Kimé, 1997.
Et pourtant elle tourne !, Paris : Kimé, 1995.
La morale et la raison, Paris : Kimé, 1994.
Les Succès de l'échec. Où va l'histoire?, Paris : Arcantère, 1993.
Les Alternances du progrès. I Une histoire sans préférences, Paris : Kimé, 1992.
Le Système de l'histoire, Paris : Fayard, 1989.
Les Tournants du XXe siècle – Progrès et régressions, Paris : L'Harmattan, .

External links 

1929 births
2013 deaths
20th-century French historians
Historians of colonialism
French male non-fiction writers